The 1976–77 Princeton Tigers men's basketball team represented Princeton University in intercollegiate college basketball during the 1976–77 NCAA Division I men's basketball season. The head coach was Pete Carril and the team captain was Robert Slaughter. The team played its home games in the Jadwin Gymnasium on the University campus in Princeton, New Jersey.  The team was the champion of the Ivy League, which earned them an invitation to the 32-team 1977 NCAA Men's Division I Basketball Tournament.

The team posted a 21–5 overall record and a 13–1 conference record. The team's January 3, 1977, victory over Notre Dame was the last home win against a ranked opponent until the 2011–12 team's defeated Harvard on February 11, 2012. The team lost its next game against the  before winning twelve in a row heading into the NCAA Men's Division I Basketball Tournament. The team lost its March 12, 1977 NCAA Men's Division I Basketball Tournament East Regional first round game against the Kentucky Wildcats 72–58 at The Palestra.

The team was led by first team All-Ivy League selection Frank Sowinski, who was named Ivy League Men's Basketball Player of the Year, and by Ivy League Men's Basketball Co-Rookie of the Year Bob Roma. Sowinski led the league in field goal percentage with a 65.0% average.  His percentages of 63.2% overall and 65.0% in conference games were Ivy League single-season records that stood for two years.  The team was the second of nineteen Princeton teams and the second in a row to win the national statistical championship in scoring defense with an average of 51.7 points allowed. That was an NCAA record (since 1965) that surpassed the team's prior season record of 52.9 and that would stand for three years.

References

Princeton Tigers men's basketball seasons
Princeton
Princeton
Princeton Tigers
Princeton Tigers